The second USS Sylvia (SP-471), later USS SP-471, was a United States Navy patrol vessel in commission from 1917 to 1919.

Sylvia was built as a private motorboat of the same name by Sam Williams at Marco, Florida. On 6 June 1917, the U.S. Navy acquired her from her owner, J. Alwood of Winter Haven, Florida, for use as a section patrol vessel during World War I. She was commissioned as USS Sylvia (SP-471) on 4 September 1917.

Assigned to the 7th Naval District, Sylvia operated on patrol duty in Florida waters for the rest of World War I and into early 1919. On 11 April 1918 her name was changed to USS SP-471 to avoid confusion with the first , a patrol yacht which also was in commission at the time.

SP-471 was out of commission and awaiting sale when she became one of eight section patrol boats destroyed at North Beach Basin at Key West, Florida, on 9 September 1919 by the 1919 Florida Keys Hurricane. Anchored in the basin when the hurricane struck, she was beaten to pieces against the basins wall and completely wrecked.

Sources vary as to when SP-471 was stricken from the Navy List. It may have occurred on 24 April 1919 in advance of her being put up for sale or on 4 October 1919 after her destruction.

Notes

References

Department of the Navy Naval History and Heritage Command Online Library of Selected Images: U.S. Navy Ships: USS Sylvia (SP-471), 1917-1919. Later renamed SP-471. Originally the Civilian Motor Boat Sylvia
NavSource Online: Section Patrol Craft Photo Archive: SP-471 ex-Sylvia (SP 471)

Patrol vessels of the United States Navy
World War I patrol vessels of the United States
Ships built in Florida
Maritime incidents in 1919
Shipwrecks of the Florida Keys